Beneyam Belye Demte (Amharic: ቤኔያም ዴምቴ; born 18 July 1998) is an Ethiopian professional footballer who plays as an attacking midfielder for Ethiopian Premier League club Saint George and the Ethiopia national team.

Career statistics

Club

Beneyam began his career at CBE SA. From June 2017 he completed a trial in Germany at the second division Dynamo Dresden. In mid-July 2017, it was announced that Belye will not receive a contract. He then trained with the league rivals FC Erzgebirge Aue. He also had an invitation at Austria Bundesliga club FC Red Bull Salzburg  for a test training. He was not obliged by both.

In August 2017, Belye finally signed with Albania to KF Skënderbeu Korçë. He made his league debut for the club on 15 October 2017 in a 4-1 home victory over KF Lushnja. He was subbed on for Ali Sowe in the 78th minute.
On February 23, 2019 Beneyam joined Swedish Division 1 Norra, second Tier team Syrianska FC on a free transfer.

International career

Beneyam  made a debut for Ethiopia in  September 2015 as he was used as a substitute in a friendly match against the Republic of Botswana.

References

External links

1998 births
Living people
Ethiopian footballers
Ethiopia international footballers
Ethiopian expatriate footballers
Expatriate footballers in Albania
Kategoria Superiore players
KF Skënderbeu Korçë players
Syrianska FC players
Association football midfielders
Ethiopian expatriate sportspeople in Albania
Sportspeople from Dire Dawa
2016 African Nations Championship players
Ethiopia A' international footballers
Ethiopian expatriate sportspeople in Sweden
Expatriate footballers in Sweden
2022 African Nations Championship players